This is a list of Sacred Heart players in the NFL Draft.

Key

Selections

References

Lists of National Football League draftees by college football team

Sacred Heart Pioneers NFL Draft